The Portuguese Outdoor Men's Championship is the top division of men's team's in Athletics. It is a competition organised by the Federação Portuguesa de Atletismo. The league consists of 8 teams that are selected after a playoff.

Champions by year

1939: Benfica
1940: Benfica
1941: Sporting
1942: Benfica
1943: Sporting
1944: Benfica
1945: Sporting
1946: Sporting
1947: Sporting
1948: Sporting
1949: Benfica
1950: Sporting
1951: Benfica
1952: Porto
1953: Benfica
1954: Benfica
1955: Benfica
1956: Sporting
1957: Sporting
1958: Sporting
1959: Sporting
1960: Sporting
1961: Sporting
1962: Sporting
1963: Sporting
1964: Sporting
1965: Sporting

1966: Sporting
1967: Benfica
1968: Sporting
1969: Sporting
1970: Sporting
1971: Sporting
1972: Sporting
1973: Sporting
1974: Sporting
1975: Sporting
1976: Sporting
1977: Sporting
1978: Sporting
1979: Sporting
1980: Benfica
1981: Sporting
1982: Benfica
1983: Benfica
1984: Benfica
1985: Sporting
1986: Benfica
1987: Sporting
1988: Sporting
1989: Benfica
1990: Benfica
1991: Benfica
1992: Benfica

1993: Benfica
1994: Benfica
1995: Sporting
1996: Benfica
1997: Sporting
1998: Sporting
1999: Sporting
2000: Sporting
2001: Porto
2002: Sporting
2003: Sporting
2004: Sporting
2005: Sporting
2006: Sporting
2007: Sporting
2008: Sporting
2009: Sporting
2010: Sporting
2011: Benfica
2012: Benfica
2013: Benfica
2014: Benfica
2015: Benfica
2016: Benfica
2017: Benfica
2018: Benfica
2019: Benfica

2020: Benfica
2021: Benfica
2022: Benfica

Performance by club

Championships records

See also
Portuguese Outdoor Women's Athletics Championship

References

External links
 Portuguese Athletics Federation official website

Athletics competitions in Portugal
Recurring sporting events established in 1939
Portuguese Athletics Championship
National athletics competitions
1939 establishments in Portugal
Men's athletics competitions